The 2009 British Formula 3 International Series (for sponsorship reasons, the Cooper Tires British Formula 3 International Series) was the 59th British Formula 3 International Series season. It began on 13 April at Oulton Park's Easter Monday meeting and ended on 20 September at Brands Hatch after 20 rounds in four countries. Australian driver Daniel Ricciardo won the title with two races to spare, at the penultimate round at the Autódromo Internacional do Algarve in Portimão. Daniel McKenzie sealed the National Class title during the same race.

Drivers and teams

Calendar
The calendar for 2009 saw the total number of races drop from 22 to 20. Three overseas events remain, with the 24 Hours of Spa-supporting event the only one to remain from 2008. However, the Monza 1000km-supporting races and the FIA GT-support event in Bucharest were dropped to be replaced by the series' first visit to Germany and to Hockenheim, and also a visit to the brand-new Autódromo Internacional do Algarve in Portugal. Thruxton and Croft have also been dropped to be replaced with a second meeting at Silverstone. Donington's meeting was originally scheduled for 26 April, however due to ongoing issues with the circuit's track licence, the meeting was rescheduled for 19 July.

 1 Fastest lap recorded by Jules Bianchi, but he was ineligible to score the fastest lap point.
 2 Fastest lap recorded by Esteban Gutiérrez, but he was ineligible to score the fastest lap point.

Standings

See also
 2009 Masters of Formula 3
 2009 Macau Grand Prix

References

External links
 The official website of the British Formula 3 Championship

British Formula Three Championship seasons
Formula Three season
British
British Formula 3 Championship